Power (stylized as POWER) is the debut extended play (EP) by American actor and singer Alex Newell. It was released on February 19, 2016, by Big Beat Records. It charted at No. 11 on the Billboard Heatseekers Albums chart on 12 March 2016.

Background

In late 2014, Newell featured in the last series of American television series Glee and was soon after signed to Big Beat Records. Shortly afterwards his signing, he released his debut single, a cover Sigma's song "Nobody to Love". The track was primarily conducted and produced by Nile Rodgers.

In March 2015, Newell collaborated with several artists. He featured on Clean Bandit's last single from their 2015 debut album New Eyes alongside Sean Bass, entitled "Stronger". The song was originally intended to have Olly Alexander, until the group replaced him for the official version with Bass and Newell. He also featured on The Knocks' "Collect My Love", which formed part of their 2015 extended play So Classic and later their 2016 debut album 55. The third feature he did was with electro duo Blonde, on their single "All Cried Out".

He also released he second single within that same month, which was a cover of Robin S.' single "Show Me Love". It was produced by and released in collaboration with Russian DJ Matvey Emerson. Later after the single was released, he began working behind the scenes with DJ Cassidy, Nile Rodgers and Jess Glynne on the song "Kill the Lights". It was recorded for the 2016 HBO TV series Vinyl. This sparked Newell's interest into producing his debut extended play with the collaborators.

In the end of 2015, Newell released a cover of "O Come, All Ye Faithfull", which was released for the 2015 Christmas holiday.

In January 2016, Newell revealed his debut extended play under the title Power and that it would be released on February 19, 2016. He also revealed the new single from the EP, entitled "This Ain't Over".

When the extended play was released, he made all of the other songs from the extended play available on his YouTube channel. During its post-release phase, he released his third single from the EP, entitled "Basically Over You (B.O.Y.)"on March 28, 2016, which eventually concluded the extended play's era. Newell soon embarked on an American tour as a guest act with Adam Lambert, performing some of the songs from his extended play.

Track listing

References

2016 debut EPs
Big Beat Records (American record label) EPs
Albums produced by MNEK